
Gmina Połajewo is a rural gmina (administrative district) in Czarnków-Trzcianka County, Greater Poland Voivodeship, in west-central Poland.

Villages
Gmina Połajewo contains the villages and settlements of Boruszyn, Krosin, Krosinek, Młynkowo, Połajewo, Przybychowo, Sierakówko and Tarnówko.

Neighbouring gminas
Gmina Połajewo is bordered by the gminas of Czarnków, Lubasz, Oborniki, Obrzycko and Ryczywół.

References
Polish official population figures 2006

Polajewo
Czarnków-Trzcianka County